Jake Muxworthy (born September 10, 1978) is an American movie and TV actor. Jake's first appearances in big roles were in the early 2000s, after doing many cameo roles previously. He mostly appears on horror and thriller genres. He also appears on short films such as Michelle Branch's video 'Everywhere'. He received his first role as a paramedic in Cradle 2 the Grave. Almost immediately it was followed by a part as 'Tim' in the comedy I Heart Huckabees.

Life and career
Jake was born on September 10, 1978, in Twisp, Washington. Jake has accepted his first lead, as 'John,' the comparatively less twisted of a psychopathic serial killer's two sons, in Morgan J. Freeman's film Born Killers (2005). In the 2007 film Borderland he plays Henry, one of a group of three college students who discovers a human sacrifice cult in a Mexican border town.  He extended his record of disturbing and dark material by landing a lead role as Holt alongside Sarah Roemer in the horror film   Asylum (2008).Holt is one of several students, who must try to free the possessed campus. He is the protagonist in the 2009 film Shadow, where he plays 'David,' who returns from  traumatic military service in Iraq only to discover a much more horrifying lost Nazi experiment camp in the Alps.

Filmography

Movie

Television

Short films

References

1978 births
People from Okanogan County, Washington
Living people